The Tujingzi Formation is a geological formation in Hebei, China whose strata date back to the Early Cretaceous. Dinosaur remains are among the fossils that have been recovered from the formation.

Vertebrate paleofauna
 Psittacosaurus sp.

See also

 List of dinosaur-bearing rock formations

References

Lower Cretaceous Series of Asia
Albian Stage